Gabriela Groell-Dinu (born 16 April 1960) is a German former professional tennis player.

Originally from Romania, Dinu played on the professional tour in the 1980s as a West German. She featured in the main draw of the French Open on three occasions, with her best performance coming as a qualifier in 1985 when she won her way through to the third round. In 1987, she reached her best ranking of 123 in the world.

ETA/ITF finals

Singles (4–2)

Doubles (3–4)

References

External links
 
 

1960 births
Living people
West German female tennis players
Romanian emigrants to Germany